Symmons is an English language surname. It stems from the male given name Simon. Notable people with the name include:

Charles Symmons (1749–1826), Welsh poet and priest
Charles Augustus John Symmons (1804–1887), Writer from Western Australia
Michael Symmons Roberts (born 1963), British poet
Nikki Symmons (born 1982), former Ireland women's field hockey international
Paul Symmons (born 1973), former Australian rules footballer
Sarah Symmons, English art historian and writer

English-language surnames
Surnames from given names